Yatir Forest is a forest in Israel on the edge of the Negev Desert. The forest covers an area of 30,000 dunams, and is the largest planted forest in Israel.

History

The first trees were planted in 1964 by the Jewish National Fund at the initiative of Yosef Weitz. It is named after the ancient Levite city of Yatir.

Over four million trees have been planted, mostly coniferous trees - Aleppo Pine and Cypress, but also many broad leafed trees such as Atlantic terebinth, tamarisk, jujube, carob, olive, fig, eucalyptus and acacia, as well as vineyards and various shrubs. Yatir Forest has changed the arid landscape of the northern Negev, despite the pessimism of many experts. It has proven to be a prime ecological instrument, halting the desertification on the heights northeast of Beersheba.

The ground is composed of hard lime rocks, and soft chalk rocks.

The Israel National Trail, marked in 1991 runs through the forest. Yatir forest is located on the trail south of Meitar and north of Arad.

Ecology research

Studies conducted in Yatir forest under the direction of Prof. Dan Yakir of the Weizmann Institute of Science, in collaboration with the Desert Research Institute at Sde Boker, have shown that the trees function as a trap for carbon in the air. Shade provided by trees planted in the desert also reduces evaporation of the sparse rainfall.

Yatir forest is  also a part of the NASA project FLUXNET, a global network of micrometeorological tower sites used to measure the exchanges of carbon dioxide, water vapor, and energy between terrestrial ecosystems and the atmosphere.

The Arava Institute for Environmental Studies conducts research at Yatir forest that focuses on crops such as dates and grapes grown in the vicinity of Yatir forest. The research is part of a project aimed at introducing new crops into arid and saline zones.

Ecological herb and essential oil farm 
The farm is based on permaculture principles, and grows vegetables, fruits, olives and medical herbs. Medical tinctures and essential oils are produced from the herbs and wild plants harvested in the desert, in cooperation with Negev Bedouins.

See also
List of forests in Israel
Jewish National Fund
Yatir winery
Agricultural research in Israel
Science and technology in Israel
Anim synagogue

References

External links

Jewish National Fund website
Weizmann Institute's Yatir Forest research group
FLUXNET
Weizmann Institute study suggests that rising carbon dioxide levels might cause forests to spread into dry environments

Forest ecology
Forests of Israel
Jewish National Fund forests and parks
Protected areas of Southern District (Israel)